This is a list of men's cycling races in Spain. This list only includes road races that are part of the UCI World Tour or UCI Europe Tour.

One day races

UCI World Tour
Clásica de San Sebastián

UCI Europe Tour

1.Pro
GP Miguel Induráin
Clásica de Almería

1.1

Trofeo Mallorca 
Trofeo Cala Millor-Cala Bona 
Trofeo Pollença 
Trofeo Soller 
Trofeo Calvià 
Note: The above five single-day races together make up the Vuelta a Mallorca 
Klasika Primavera 
Vuelta a La Rioja  (stage race until 2008)
GP Llodio
Subida al Naranco
Prueba Villafranca de Ordizia - Clasica de Ordizia
Circuito de Getxo "Memorial Ricardo Otxoa"
Subida a Urkiola 
Clásica Ciclista los Puertos

1.2

Escalada a Montjuïc 
Bilbao Klasika starting in 2007 (cancelled)
GP Área Metropolitana 
GP Ciudade de Vigo

Stage races

UCI World Tour
Vuelta a España 
Tour of the Basque Country 
Volta a Catalunya

UCI Europe Tour

2.Pro
Vuelta a Andalucía, "Ruta del Sol" 
Vuelta a Burgos 
Volta a la Comunitat Valenciana

2.1
Vuelta a Asturias 
Vuelta a la Comunidad de Madrid
Vuelta a Castilla y León 
Vuelta a Murcia 
O Gran Camiño

2.2
As of 2020, there are currently no Spanish races in this category

Discontinued stage races
Cinturón Ciclista a Mallorca 
Cinturo de l'Emporda 
Circuito Montañés
Clásica Internacional a Alcobendas y Collado Villalba (discontinued after 2008)
Euskal Bizikleta (last held in 2008 as a 2.HC event, and was merged with the Tour of the Basque Country in 2009).
Setmana Catalana de Ciclisme  (discontinued after 2005)
Tour of Galicia (discontinued)
Volta a Lleida (discontinued after 2008)
Vuelta a Aragón  (last held in 2019)
Vuelta Ciclista a León
Vuelta Ciclista a Navarra (discontinued after 2008)
Vuelta Ciclista Internacional a Extremadura

References

 
Cycling races in Spain
Cycling races